The Carnival Papers is the third album by Steve Reynolds.  The album was recorded at Blackbox Studios in Le Bourg-d'Iré, Pays de la Loire, France.  It was released 3 June 2008 on 429 Records. The song "Mistaken Identity" appears in the season 5 premiere of Grey's Anatomy.  Dream a Little Dream of Me aired on ABC 25 September 2008.

Track listing

See also
2008 in Canadian music

References

External links

2008 albums
Steve Reynolds (singer-songwriter) albums